Galga is a settlement in the northern Murray Mallee region of South Australia. The town of Galga was surveyed in 1915 after the Waikerie railway line from Karoonda to Waikerie was opened in 1914. The line was shortened to Galga in 1990, and closed completely in 1994. There is a small bulk grain silo at Galga, but it is no longer regularly used. Galga has an active Country Fire Service brigade with one fire truck.

The 2016 Australian census which was conducted in August 2016 reports that Galga had a population of 17 people.

Galga is located within the federal division of Barker, the state electoral districts of Chaffey and Hammond, and the local government areas of the District Council of Karoonda East Murray and the District Council of Loxton Waikerie.

References

Towns in South Australia